Neocoristis is a monotypic snout moth genus described by Edward Meyrick in 1937. Its only species, Neocoristis entomophaga, was described by the same author in the same year. It is known from Java, Indonesia (including Telawa, the type location).

References

Moths described in 1937
Phycitinae
Monotypic moth genera
Moths of Indonesia